The Tornjak or Bosnian Shepherd Dog, is a breed of livestock guardian dog native to Bosnia and Herzegovina and parts of Croatia. The name comes from the local word for a sheep pen, "". The foundation stock is made up from genetically homogeneous landrace shepherding dogs dispersed in the mountains and valleys of the region. They are molosser-type mountain dogs, similar to other livestock guardian breeds of the region, the Šarplaninac, Bucovina Shepherd Dog, and the Greek Shepherd.

History
Tornjaks belong to the rare livestock protection breeds and share many characteristics with other livestock guarding dogs. The Tornjak breed was first mentioned in the 11th century, and was the transhumance dog of the medieval Vlach shepherds of Bosnia. Descriptions of the Tornjak were found in the writings of Peter Horvat, bishop of Đakovo, Croatia, which date back to the year 1374, and those descriptions were also found in the writings of Peter Lukić, Canon of the Đakovo diocese, which were written in 1752. To this day, these dogs are called Toraši (Torashi) in the surroundings of the city of Sinj and on the Kamešnica mountain, whereas the shepherds of the Dinara-mountains call them Dinarci. Descriptions of Tornjaks from these documents are similar to modern descriptions, except for the name of the breed, which was Bosanski Ovčar, meaning Bosnian Shepherd Dog. It was also called the Hrvatski pas planinac, meaning Croatian mountain dog. The dogs in these documents were described similarly as such: a protective guarding dog which keeps and watches all that their owners ask them, but is highly intelligent and selectively bred to be without excessive aggression. They are also said to be pleasant toward strangers that they meet outside of their domain.

It is considered that dogs of the Tornjak's type have existed in the area around and in Dinarides (Dinaric Alps), especially in the region around Vlašić (close to the city of Travnik, Bosnia and Herzegovina) as a central area of the region since the Roman times. The Romans used their dogs for war and as guardians, as well as for fighting in the arena. Although the Tornjak is a very old breed, it gradually vanished with the vanishing of nomadic sheep herding. In the early 1970s, a group of local cynologists began to collect the remaining dogs which best corresponded to the old writings about the breed. Tornjaks were first imported to the UK in 2013 with intentions of working towards UK Kennel Club Recognition.

Characteristics

Appearance 
The Tornjaks are large dogs, with somewhat square-bodied features and relatively agile movements. In spite of this, their bones are not lightweight. In general, the Tornjak is a long-coated breed with short hair over the face and legs. The hair is distinctively long and abundant over the neck (mane), and on the back of the upper thighs (breeches). The tail is notably feathered and carried like a flag while the dog moves. The coat is very dense and cannot be parted.

As a rule, the Tornjaks are parti-colored, with white being the dominant ground color. White markings are most commonly found around the neck, over the head and along the legs. The patches can be any color. Similar to other livestock guardian dogs, the distinct markings served a utilitarian purpose, helping shepherds distinguish their dogs from both sheep and wolves.

Temperament

Tornjaks have a calm temperament. A typical adult Tornjak is very calm, peaceful, at first sight an indifferent animal, but when the situation demands it, it is a vigilant and very alert watchdog. The character is equal to the temperament; they are not nervous nor aggressive.  In general, they are very tough, not too demanding, sturdy dogs. With their human family they are very emotional. When living in a pack they are highly social animals, without fighting between the pack members. Towards strangers or other animals, as a rule, Tornjak is not overly aggressive. But when the situation calls upon it, Tornjak is quite decisive and it can without any consideration attack even much stronger rivals. Shepherds used to say that a Tornjak that guards the flock is a fair match to two wolves, and that a couple of Tornjaks will confront and chase away a bear. In these situations, Tornjaks can be very tenacious.

Activities
Tornjak's exercise levels are usually not demanding, especially in the first 9–12 months (during the last intensive growth period). They prefer long walks without a leash and a lot of playing with other dogs. They will also be just as satisfied with only a 20-minute walk if its owner is in a hurry. Tornjaks learn quickly and do not forget easily; they happily perform tasks and are therefore easy to train. Strong and hardy, during the snowy winter nights, these dogs lie on the ground and often get covered with snow without freezing due to their thick coats. They are primarily used for herding and protection of livestock.

Care
Tornjak is not recommended for apartment life. They need space and will do best with at least a large yard. Because its thick coat protects it so well it can happily cope with living outdoors provided it has proper shelter. This breed is best suited to a family with space surrounding the home where it can attend to its own exercise needs.

Tornjak is a very healthy breed, but because they were very poorly fed in their past, they now do not need much protein in their food. For feeding Tornjaks, a low protein diet is suitable. A high protein diet can lead to the development of coat problems. Climbing up and down stairs the first six months can ruin hock joints or lead to hip dysplasia (canine).

Tornjak needs early socialization. Early experiences (before 9 months of age) have a very significant effect throughout the dog's life. They need to be confronted with potentially fearful stimuli as early as possible in order to avoid later fear reactions. Traffic noise, big trucks and buses will provoke fear reactions in adulthood if the Tornjak has not previously faced these situations as a puppy. In this early age all Tornjak puppies have to meet as many unknown people as possible, and also other animals, dogs, and pets especially, for developing a good and stable behavior as an adult.

Ban
This breed is banned in Denmark.

See also
 Dogs portal
 List of dog breeds

References

External links

 Tornjak Bosnian-Herzegovinian website
 Tornjak online pedigree database
 Tornjak UK website

FCI breeds
Dog breeds originating in Bosnia and Herzegovina
Dog breeds originating in Croatia
Livestock guardian dogs